Qatar participated at the 16th Asian Games in Guangzhou, China.

Medalists

Aquatics

Athletics

Basketball

Bowling

Boxing

Cue Sports

Chess

Cycling

Equestrian

Fencing

Football

Golf

Gymnastics

Handball

Judo

Karate

Sailing

Shooting

Squash

Table Tennis

Taekwondo

Tennis

Volleyball

Weightlifting

Wrestling

Nations at the 2010 Asian Games
2010
Asian Games